Frances Patiky Stein (27 September 1937 – 6 June 2021) was a French-American fashion designer.

Early life 
Stein was born in Huntington, N.Y., on Long Island. Her mother, Frieda Krakower, was a homemaker and her father, Jacob owned a division retailer in Kings Park. Frances attended Smith College for 3 years before dropping out to work at Harper’s Bazaar.

Career 
Stein launched her career in the magazine world, working at Harper’s Bazaar, Glamour and Vogue. She then worked as a fashion editor and stylist for Halston, Calvin Klein and Chanel and had her own jewelry and accessory line from the late 80’s to mid 90’s.

Death 
Stein died 2021 of lung cancer at her apartment in Paris at the age of 84.

References 

1937 births
2021 deaths
American fashion designers
American people of French descent
People from Huntington, New York